Romance in the Dark is a 1938 American comedy musical film directed by H. C. Potter and starring Gladys Swarthout, John Boles, John Barrymore, and Claire Dodd.  It is one of five films produced by Paramount in the 1930s featuring Gladys Swarthout, a very popular Metropolitan Opera mezzo-soprano.  The studio was attempting to build on the popularity of Grace Moore, another opera singer, who had also expanded her talents into films. It is based upon the play The Yellow Nightingale by Hermann Bahr.

Cast

See also

 Rose of the Rancho (1936)
 Give Us This Night (1936)
 Champagne Waltz (1937)
 Ambush (1939)

References

External links

1938 films
Films directed by H. C. Potter
Paramount Pictures films
American romantic musical films
American black-and-white films
1930s romantic musical films
1930s American films